Leon Thomas "Pepper" Daniels (born August 20, 1902 and died September 25, 1978) was a Negro leagues catcher during the first Negro National League.

He played most of his seasons for the Detroit Stars.

References

External links
 and Baseball-Reference Black Baseball stats and Seamheads

Negro league baseball managers
Chicago American Giants players
Detroit Stars players
Bacharach Giants players
Brooklyn Eagles players
Pollock's Cuban Stars players
People from Valdosta, Georgia
1902 births
1978 deaths
Baseball catchers
Baseball players from Georgia (U.S. state)
People from Chester, Orange County, New York
20th-century African-American sportspeople